Little Meg's Children is a 1921 British silent film directed by Bert Wynne and starring Joan Griffith and Warwick Ward.

Cast
 Joan Griffith 
 Warwick Ward 
 C. Hargrave Mansell
 Stella Nelson

References

Bibliography
 Palmer, Scott. British Film Actors' Credits, 1895-1987. McFarland, 1988.

External links

1921 films
British silent feature films
Films directed by Bert Wynne
British black-and-white films
1920s English-language films